Draim Arena is an out-of-print trading card game developed by the Swedish company Draim and released in Sweden in the autumn of 2006. It was the first,game released by this company. The game is set on the continent of Disia in the fantasy world Draimia, the company's trademark setting.

The game can be played by two or more players, although the typical game is played with four players. Each game represents a battle between armies in the Bautadon stadium in the land of Grytland. Each player builds and controls an army of one to five characters, represented by character cards. Additional arena cards represent spells, artifacts and strategies that are played upon the players' own cards or on cards in opponents' armies.

Game play 

Draim Arena is played with several different rule sets; two basic rule sets are presented on the official website, and two additional tournament setups for each rule set. The two rule sets are called 9-card and 30-card, based on the number of cards used. Most of the rules are common to both rule sets and the difference is primarily the number of cards in the deck.

In the game players put armies against each other and the player whose army is defeated loses the game, the winner is the player that in the end stands alone. The armies are built one character at a time, a player cannot attack opponents during a turn that a new character is added to the army and players therefore have to balance play between reinforcing the army and playing aggressively to defeat opponents.

The use of character cards are central to the game; these form the army and are required, in order to play arena cards. Each character can take damage two times, the first time they are turned, and the second they are dead and put in the grave. Cards in the grave cannot be used during the rest of the same game. Turned characters can be healed, either by the use of certain arena cards or by turning another character in your own army during phase two. This last choice prevents that same player from attacking or playing a character card that turn, however and this should therefore be considered.

Game play is built around four phases that divide each player's turn. These four phases allow different actions and card types to be played. Every time a player starts a turn it begins with phase one and continues through all four until the turn is over and next player starts.
The phases allow the following:1. play phase 1 arena cards. 2. play a new character card, switch places between two characters, heal a character or attack a player. 3. preparation for battle (only in case of attack during phase 2). 4. battle (only in case of attack during phase 2). If attack is chosen during phase two a special tactical die is used to decide which character in the attacking and the defending armies will fight.  The fight during phase four is primarily decided with the use of another die, called battle die. The use of dice has been compared with pencil-and-paper Role-playing games and set this game apart from most other card games.

9-card

In this rule set each player build a deck of nine cards, with a free mix of character cards and arena cards. All cards are played in the hand from the start and can therefore be played at any time.

30-card

In this rule set each player uses a total of 30 cards. 25 arena cards and 5 character cards. The major difference from 9-card play is that all arena cards are put in a library from start and are therefore not available to play. To make the cards in the library available the player has to do one of two things, either turning a character in phase one and draw one card from the library or by killing a character in an opponent army.

Tournament play

Two different tournament formats are used in official play; emperor and conqueror. The difference between them are basically that emperor is a format with pre-made decks and conqueror is a variation of sealed deck. During play in conqueror format some changes are applied, primarily concerning how many instances of each card and card type can be used.

Deck building 

Like in other Trading card games, deck building is a central part of the strategy of the game, since this offers a chance to build a unique deck and surprise your opponents. Depending on which type of game you prefer, 9 or 30 cards, the setup of the deck can vary greatly. The use of arena cards is often more central in play with 30 cards. In 30-cards, the deck may only include one of each character and two of each arena card. 9-card, only allows one instance of each card. During tournaments in the conqueror format, there is no limit to this, and a deck can have any number of each card. The deck however cannot be bigger than 20 cards in this format.

Story background 

The game is set in a fantasy world called Draimia. Like other comparable fantasy worlds such as Middle-earth, this is a high fantasy setting, featuring a number of different creatures and species unique to this world. The game also features an open use of magic and enchanted artifacts that enhance characters in a number of ways.
The company behind the game posted on their now-defunct Swedish official website that a number this world would be used for a number of other properties, such as comic books, a board game and a Role-playing game.
The story behind the game was meant to be released a bit at a time, so that players would find out more about it as it progressed.

  Card games introduced in 2006
Fantasy games
Collectible card games